"Walk of Shame" is a song by American singer-songwriter Pink, taken from her sixth studio album The Truth About Love (2012). It was written by Pink and Greg Kurstin, and produced by the latter. It was released exclusively to Australian radio on September 25, 2013, as the fifth single from the album.

Music video
An official lyric video for the song was uploaded to Pink's VEVO channel on September 14, 2012 in conjunction with the release of its parent album.

Released October 4, 2013, the official music video for "Walk of Shame" features tour footage from her Australian shows. It can only be viewed through the singer's YouTube and VEVO channels in Australia.

Credits and personnel 
Recording
 Mastered at Sterling Sound (New York City)

Management
 EMI Blockwood Music, Inc./P!nk Inside Music (BMI), Kurstin Music/EMI April Music, Inc. (ASCAP)

Personnel
 Pink – lead vocals, songwriter
 Greg Kurstin – songwriter, record producer, keyboards, guitar, bass, programming, engineering and mixing at Echo Studio, Los Angeles, CA
 Jesse Shatkin – additional engineering

Credits adapted from the liner notes of The Truth About Love (Deluxe Edition).

Chart performance
"Walk of Shame" entered the ARIA Top 100 Singles chart at No. 100 for the week commencing October 7, 2013.

Certifications

References

2012 songs
2013 singles
Song recordings produced by Greg Kurstin
Songs written by Greg Kurstin
Songs written by Pink (singer)
RCA Records singles